The 2002 ANZ Tasmanian International was a women's tennis tournament played on outdoor hard courts at the Hobart International Tennis Centre in Hobart, Australia and was part of Tier V of the 2002 WTA Tour. It was the ninth edition of the tournament and ran from 6 January until 12 January 2002. Unseeded Martina Suchá won the singles title and earned $16,000 first-prize money.

Finals

Singles

 Martina Suchá defeated  Anabel Medina Garrigues 7–6(9–7), 6–1
 It was Suchá's first title of her career.

Doubles

 Tathiana Garbin /  Rita Grande defeated  Catherine Barclay /  Christina Wheeler 6–2, 7–6(7–3)

External links
 Official website
 ITF tournament edition details
 Tournament draws

Tasmanian International
Tasmanian International
Hobart International